This is a list of Israeli football transfers for the 2007–08 season. Only moves featuring at least one Israeli Premier League club are listed.

2007

May

June

July

2008

May

Notes and references

Israel
Transfers
2007-2008